Vanasco is a surname. Notable people with the surname include:

Alberto Vanasco (1925–1993), Argentine writer and poet
Jeannie Vanasco, American writer
Jennifer Vanasco (born 1971), American journalist